Politics, an Instruction Manual is a 2016 documentary film directed by Fernando León of Aranoa where the director and his team follow to the leaders of Podemos during roughly a year and half until the elections to the Congress of Spain of 20 December 2015. It was released in Spain on June 3, 2016.

References

External links
 

2016 films
Spanish documentary films
Documentary films about politics
Podemos (Spanish political party)
Films directed by Fernando León de Aranoa
2010s Spanish films